The Big Moment is an American television game show based on the original Japanese version called Happy Family Plan. It aired on ABC in 1999 and was hosted by Brad Sherwood. John Cramer served as announcer. It was originally an hour-long series, but due to low ratings, was cut to a half-hour after its second episode.

The show's premise centered on one member of a family (or group of people) who was given one week to practice a certain task before the episode's taping. A video camera was provided to record the rehearsal process at home. At the end of the week, the contestant (and his/her family and other supporters) came to the studio to perform the task. The contestant was given only one attempt; if successful, he/she won a pre-selected prize package worth $25,000. If unsuccessful, he/she received a $2,000 consolation prize. Two contestants appeared each episode.

Some of the stunts presented:
 Memorizing pi to the 100th decimal
 Playing Beethoven's Für Elise on a piano, without missing a note
 Answering ten questions on the film Ghost
 Riding around three cones on a unicycle and returning to a starting line
 Pulling a tablecloth out from a fully set table without any items hitting the floor or glasses being knocked over (this stunt was featured at least twice)
 Identifying 12 random flavors of Baskin-Robbins ice cream while blindfolded
 Teaching a puppy 5 new tricks

On later episodes, Sherwood went into the audience after the first contestant's stunt and randomly selected someone to perform a task at the end of the show (after some time to train for the task). Tasks included memorizing other audience members' names and birth months, spontaneously crying within 30 seconds, and breaking into a car on stage within 90 seconds. If successful, he/she won $5,000.

External links
 
 IT FEELS LIKE GAME SHOW, LOOKS LIKE FUNNIEST VIDEOS 'HAPPY HOUR'
 Big Moment

American Broadcasting Company original programming
1990s American game shows
1999 American television series debuts
1999 American television series endings
American television series based on Japanese television series